W.W. (Winter), was an early British car made by Winter and Company of Wandsworth, London.  They made two models between 1913 and 1914.

The first car, the W.W. of 1913 was a light car powered by an 8 hp V-twin engine bought in from the Precision company. This drove the rear wheels through a gear box by Chater-Lea and shaft drive to a worm gear final drive on the rear axle.

For 1914 production changed to a cyclecar.  This was sold as a Winter and had a Blumfield engine and friction drive with belt to the rear axle.

The number made is not known.

See also
List of car manufacturers of the United Kingdom

References 

 David Culshaw, Peter Horrobin: The Complete Catalogue of British Cars 1895-1975. Veloce Publishing plc, Dorchester 1997, .
 Harald Linz, Halwart Schrader: Die Internationale Automobil-Enzyklopädie. United Soft Media Verlag, München 2008, . 
 George Nick Georgano (Chefredakteur): The Beaulieu Encyclopedia of the Automobile. Volume 3: P–Z. Fitzroy Dearborn Publishers, Chicago 2001, . (englisch)

Defunct motor vehicle manufacturers of England
Cyclecars
Motor vehicle manufacturers based in London
Vehicle manufacturing companies established in 1913
Companies based in the London Borough of Wandsworth